Oxford bypass may refer to:

 Oxford Ring Road, a road orbiting Oxford, England and acting as a bypass for various routes
 Kennett Square - Oxford Bypass, part of U.S. Route 1 near Oxford, Pennsylvania